The RMIT School of Life and Physical Sciences was an Australian tertiary education school within the College of Science Engineering and Health of RMIT University.

See also
RMIT University

School of Life and Physical Sciences, RMIT